Nauris Puntulis (born 17 July 1961) is a Latvian politician. , he serves as Minister of Culture in the Kariņš cabinet. He is affiliated with the National Alliance party.He was re-elected for his second term as 
the  Culture Minister in 2022. From December 14th and on, he is serving the Kariņš 2nd cabinet

References 

1961 births
Living people
People from Talsi Municipality
National Alliance (Latvia) politicians
Ministers of Culture of Latvia
Deputies of the 14th Saeima
21st-century Latvian politicians